Beeston Cliffs is a  biological and geological Site of Special Scientific Interest in Sheringham in Norfolk. It is a Geological Conservation Review site.

This is the type site for the Beestonian stage of the Early Pleistocene, between around 1.8 and 0.8 million years ago. It has both marine and freshwater deposits. There is a nationally rare plant, purple broomrape, in calcareous grassland on the clifftop.

There is public access to the site.

References

,

Sites of Special Scientific Interest in Norfolk
Geological Conservation Review sites